"I Won't Dance" is a song with music by Jerome Kern that has become a jazz standard. The song has two different sets of lyrics: the first written by Oscar Hammerstein II and Otto Harbach in 1934, and second written by Dorothy Fields (though Jimmy McHugh was also credited) in 1935. 

Kern, Hammerstein and Harbach originally wrote "I Won't Dance" for the 1934 London musical Three Sisters. However, Three Sisters flopped and was quickly forgotten.

The next year, Fields was hired to help with the music for a film version of the 1933 Kern-Harbach musical Roberta. The writing team decided to make use of "I Won't Dance" for the film, also named Roberta. However, Fields rewrote nearly all of the lyrics, making the song more playful and suggestive by having the narrator refuse to dance because "I know that music leads the way to romance". The song became such a hit, largely due to the fact that it was performed by Fred Astaire, that it is now included in all stage revivals and recordings of Roberta.

Notable recordings
1952: Kaye Ballard & Jack Cassidy – Roberta Studio Cast Recording 
1956: Anita O'Day – Pick Yourself Up with Anita O'Day 
1956: Carmen Cavallaro – Eddy Duchin Remembered
1957: Frank Sinatra – A Swingin' Affair! (and Sinatra-Basie, 1962)
1957: Blossom Dearie – Blossom Dearie (Et Tu Bruce; 1984)
1960; Margaret Whiting – Margaret Whiting Sings the Jerome Kern Songbook
1962; Johnny Mathis - Live It Up!
1961: Ella Fitzgerald – Ella Swings Brightly with Nelson 
1963: Peggy Lee – Mink Jazz 
1970: Jula de Palma – Jula al Sistina 
1973: The Pasadena Roof Orchestra – The Best of the Pasadena Roof Orchestra
1993:  David Silverman Trio (I Have Dreamed CD)  Chase Music Group – Los Angeles, CA 
1994: Sylvia McNair with André Previn and David Finck – Sure Thing: The Jerome Kern Songbook 
1997: Susannah McCorkle – The People That You Never Get To Love
1997: Barbara Cook – Oscar Winners: The Lyrics of Oscar Hammerstein, II
1999: Stacey Kent – Let Yourself Go: Celebrating Fred Astaire 
1999: Busdriver – "I Won't Dance"
2002: Will Young – Pop Idol: The Big Band Album 
2004: Jane Monheit and Michael Bublé – Taking a Chance on Love
2007: Richard Rodney Bennett – Words and Music
2009: Jessica Lange and Malcolm Gets – their duet recorded in common for the soundtrack Grey Gardens
2010: Sarah McKenzie – Don't Tempt Me (2011), We Could Be Lovers (2014).
2013: The King's Singers - Great American Songbook
2014: Lady Gaga and Tony Bennett – Cheek to Cheek
2015: Jamie Parker with John Wilson Orchestra - Celebrating Frank Sinatra (DVD)
2021: Willie Nelson and Diana Krall - That's Life

In film and television
The song was added to the 1935 film version of "Roberta", sung by Fred Astaire and Ginger Rogers, danced to (solo) by Fred Astaire, then reprised as a dance by both.

The song is anachronistically used as a musical number performed by Felicia Day in the television film biography of President Franklin D. Roosevelt, Warm Springs, which largely takes place in the year 1924.

The song was also performed by Lucille Bremer and Van Johnson for the 1946 Kern biopic Till the Clouds Roll By. Since the scene takes place in a 1920s nightclub, its appearance in the chronology of the film is, again, anachronistic.

The song was sung and danced to by Marge Champion and Gower Champion in the 1952 film "Lovely to Look At".

The version of the song by Frank Sinatra was in a scene in the movie What Women Want, where the character Nick, played by Mel Gibson, is dancing with a coat hanger.

The song was performed on The Muppet Show Episode 34 in a scene where Miss Piggy asks Kermit the Frog to dance.

The song was performed as a duet by Jessica Lange and Malcolm Gets playing the roles of "Big Edie" Edith Bouvier Beale and George Gould Strong in HBO's 2009 dramatization Grey Gardens based on the 1975 documentary Grey Gardens.

References

Pop standards
Songs with music by Jerome Kern
Songs with lyrics by Otto Harbach
Songs with lyrics by Oscar Hammerstein II
Ella Fitzgerald songs
Frank Sinatra songs
Fred Astaire songs
1934 songs
Songs about dancing